Biswa Bangla Convention Centre is a convention centre in Kolkata, West Bengal, India. It was built by West Bengal Housing Infrastructure Development Corporation (HIDCO) and opened in the year 2017. It was built to attract meetings, incentives, conferences and exhibitions (MICE) tourism in the city.

Location 

The Biswa Bangla Convention Centre is located on Biswa Bangla Sarani, Action Area I of New Town, Kolkata; near the Kolkata Gate. Other nearby notable structures include Rabindra Tirtha, Naval Aircraft Museum and Presidency University New Town Campus. The under construction Biswa Bangla Convention Centre metro station (previously CBD 1 metro station) of Kolkata Metro Line 6 will serve this area. The earlier named Convention Centre metro station was renamed as Eco Park metro station.

Details 
It is a ten-storeyed building which houses a convention hall, two auditoriums and four banquet cum exhibition halls, with each having 3200 seats, 400 seats and 270–72 seats respectively. There are 822 parking spaces, executive lounges, swimming pool, gymnasiums etc. It also has a hotel behind the main building, with 100 rooms, which is operated on a Public Private Partnership (PPP) basis. Larsen & Toubro was the contractor and Dulal Mukherjee & Associates was the architecture firm behind this project. The basic idea was taken from Vigyan Bhavan, a convention centre in Delhi. It is one of the largest convention centre in India and South Asia. With this Kolkata became a meetings, incentives, conferences and exhibitions (MICE) destination in the country. The convention centre was also used for COVID-19 vaccination drive.

See also 

 Rabindra Sadan

References

External links 

 Official website

Convention centres in India
2017 establishments in India